Shamma bint Suhail bin Faris Al Mazrouei (born 22 February 1993) is an Emirati politician who is Minister of State for Youth Affairs in the United Arab Emirates. In February 2016, she became the youngest government minister in the world.

Early life and education
Al Mazrui was born on 22 February 1993 in Abu Dhabi. Shamma is the daughter of Suhail Faris Ghanim Ateish Al Mazrui, business man, who was also the Chairman of Dubai Investments board of directors for over 20 years. Shamma's brother Faris Sohail Faris Al Mazrui is the Head of Mubadala's Russia and CIS Investment Program; while her twin brother Ahmed Suhail Faris Al Mazrui, is the Royal Military Academy Sandhurst, 2017 International Sword of Honor and a tech investor.

Al Mazrui is an alumna of The International School of Choueifat, Abu Dhabi, Class of 2010.

Al Mazrui has a Bachelor of Arts in Economics with a concentration in Finance from New York University Abu Dhabi. Shamma also spent a semester in New York City at the Stern School of Business. She obtained her Masters of Public Policy with distinction from the Blavatnik School of Government at the University of Oxford in 2015. She was the UAE's first Rhodes scholar. Al Mazrui is fluent in Arabic, English, French and Chinese.

Career

On February 7, 2023, Sheikh Mohammed bin Rashid Al Maktoum announced a cabinet reshuffle where Shamma was appointed as the Minster of Community Development.
Additionally, Shamma is the Secretary General of the Education and Human Resources Council ;and the President of the National Center for Education Quality.

On January 12, 2023, Shamma Suhail Faris Al Mazrui was appointed as the UAE's COP28 Youth Climate Champion.

Al Mazrui was appointed by Prime Minister Mohammed bin Rashid Al Maktoum as Minister of State for Youth Affairs in February 2016 at age 22, making her the youngest member of the UAE cabinet and the youngest government minister in the world. Shamma went through a very rigorous interview process; Al Mazrui is one of eight women in the twenty-nine member Cabinet. She presides over the National Youth Council, which brings together young professionals from a variety of backgrounds to represent the affairs of youth to the government. Al Mazrui is also the Vice-Chair of the Arab Youth Center. She has also established "youth circles" which allow young people to register to participate in consultative meetings to explore significant issues such as climate change and education.

In August 2016, Al Mazrui used Twitter to ask young UAE citizens to participate in a "National Programme for the Values of Emirati Youth". In September 2016, she spoke about the role of youth in the Middle East at a think tank in Washington DC organised by the Atlantic Council.

Al Mazrui worked in private equity in an Abu Dhabi sovereign wealth fund, and as a public policy analyst at the UAE Mission to the United Nations. She interned as a Research Analyst at the UAE Embassy in Washington D.C.; as a Ministry Policy Analyst in the Prime Minister's Office, and as an Education Policy Researcher at Tamkeen (Abu Dhabi's Strategic Affairs Authority).

Institutional oversight
Al Mazrui was appointed as Chair of the Special Olympics UAE Board in 2017 by Sheikh Mohammed bin Rashid Al Maktoum, Vice President of the United Arab Emirates. She is also the Vice Chair of the Community and Legacy Committee of the UAE Special Olympics World Games (2019).

Al Mazrui is a board member of the Emirates Foundation for Youth Development, an independent-philanthropic body which assists in public and private sector partnerships. She is also a member of the Education and Human Resources Council, 

Al Mazrui serves as a member on the Higher National Committee of the Year of Zayed, 2018 and the Higher National Council of the Year of Giving (2017).

Al Mazrui was named as one of the Committee members that will oversee the UAE's Year Of Tolerance, 2019

Board Member of Generation Unlimited's Global Leadership Council

Awards and honours
 Rhodes Scholarship 2014
 Leadership and Innovation Delegate to the Academy of Achievement’s 51st International Achievement Summit (2014)
 Sheikh Mansour bin Zayed Distinction Award (2015)
 Coutts Future Leader Award (2015)

ABLF Award Recipient, 2022, Rising Star.

References

External links
 UAE Cabinet profile

1993 births
Living people
Government ministers of the United Arab Emirates
New York University Abu Dhabi alumni
People from Abu Dhabi
Emirati Rhodes Scholars
Women government ministers of the United Arab Emirates